Finnish Iranians or Iranian Finns or Iranians in Finland are Finns of Iranian heritage.

Migration
A crime organization tried to sneak illegal Iranian immigrants through the Russian border. According to the Southeast Finland Border Guard District, if they succeeded, they would be smuggling 3-6 Iranians nearly every day. 1979 Iranian Revolution also led to several Iranians moving to Finland.

Demographics

55.9% of Finnish Iranians are male and 44.1% are female.

Society
In January 2018, there was a protest held in Central Helsinki, in which 50 Iranians participated in. They wanted Iran to kick out the president Hassan Rouhani and the supreme leader Ali Khamenei. In August 2019, supporters of the People's Mujahedin of Iran held a protest rally in Finland against Iran's foreign minister Javad Zarif.

28% of Iranians are employed, 18% are unemployed and 53% are outside the labour force. Of those inside the labour force, 61% are employed and 39% are unemployed. There are nearly 100 Iranian entrepreneurs. 342 Iranian men are in a registered relationship with a Finnish woman, and 126 Iranian women are in a registered relationship with a Finnish man.

Notable Finnish Iranians

 Arman Alizad, tailor, fashion columnist and a TV-personality
 Honar Abdi, footballer
 Reza Heidari, footballer
 Ana Diamond, politician and human rights activist
 Alexis Kouros, writer, documentary-maker, director, and producer
 Tabe Slioor, socialite, reporter, and photojournalist
 Axl Smith, former presenter and entertainer

See also 
 Finland–Iran relations

References

Finland–Iran relations
Ethnic groups in Finland
 
Middle Eastern diaspora in Finland
Muslim communities in Europe